Yidalpta is a genus of moths of the family Erebidae. The genus was erected by Ian W. B. Nye in 1975.

Species
Yidalpta aequiferalis Walker, 1865
Yidalpta auragalis Guenée, 1854
Yidalpta flavagalis Guenée, 1854
Yidalpta selenalis Snellen, 1872
Yidalpta selenialis Snellen, 1872
Yidalpta thetys Felder, 1874

References

Calpinae